Chris Guccione may refer to:
 Chris Guccione (tennis) (born 1985), Australian tennis player
 Chris Guccione (umpire) (born 1974), umpire in Major League Baseball